This Is Not a Movie is a Canadian documentary film, directed by Yung Chang and released in 2019. The film profiles the career of Robert Fisk, the influential British war correspondent.

The film premiered at the 2019 Toronto International Film Festival. In 2020, with its commercial distribution plan disrupted by the COVID-19 pandemic in Canada, Blue Ice Docs made the film available for online streaming rental in conjunction with a number of film festivals and independent theatres, including the Hot Docs Canadian International Documentary Festival, the Cinéfest Sudbury International Film Festival, the Reel Shorts Film Festival and the Kelowna Rotary Centre for the Arts.

References

External links

This is Not a Movie at Library and Archives Canada

2019 films
2019 documentary films
Canadian documentary films
National Film Board of Canada documentaries
Documentary films about journalists
2010s English-language films
2010s Canadian films